Ma'aser Sheni (Hebrew: מעשר שני, lit. "Second Tithe") is the eighth tractate of Seder Zeraim ("Order of Seeds") of the Mishnah and of the Talmud. It concerns the second tithe obligation as well as the laws of Revai.

External links
Full text of the Mishnah for tractate Ma'aser Sheni on Sefaria (Hebrew and English)

Land of Israel laws in Judaism
Tithes in Judaism